Haemanota nigricollum is a moth of the family Erebidae. It is found in Ecuador.

References

 

Haemanota
Moths described in 1892